The state secrets doctrine may refer to:
State secrets privilege in the United States
Official Secrets Act elsewhere